National Administration Council elections were held in Uruguay on 27 November 1932. The various factions of the Colorado Party received almost two-thirds of the vote.

Results

References

Elections in Uruguay
Uruguay
National Administration
Uruguay
Election and referendum articles with incomplete results